Stoney Stanton is a large village in the Blaby district of Leicestershire, England with a population of over 3,454 in 2001, increasing to 3,793 at the 2011 census.  It constitutes a civil parish.  
The village lies some five miles east of Hinckley, just to the east of the M69.  Nearby villages include Croft and Sapcote. It is some ten miles from Leicester.  As may be gathered from its name it is set on rocky outcrops of igneous rock, granodiorite, a fact which has had its influence on its history. Even in the eighteenth century, Parish records show that gravel and stone were being removed from Carey (or quarry) Hill in the centre of the village. That would later, in the nineteenth and twentieth centuries be quarried for its valuable stone, along with Lanes Hill (now the water-sports & diving centre known as Stoney Cove), Clint Hill, and Hall's Court. Carey Hill and Hall's Court quarries were later filled in, but Clint Hill remains, a relic of the village's industrial heritage, now filled with water and a haven for wild-life.

The village is of ancient origin, being mentioned in the Domesday Survey of Leicestershire (1086)
In Guthlaxton Wapentake…. Robert the Bursar holds in STANTONE 6 caracutes of land. Land for […….ploughs] 7 villagers with 3 smallholders have 3 ploughs; 4 free men; meadow, 12 acres; woodland 3 furlongs long and 1 furlong wide.
The value was and is 20s

Locations
Prior to the growth of industry, the village was mainly dependent on farming. Several old farmhouses can  still be identified in the heart of the village, the staple being sheep-farming, evidenced by records of local occupations, wool combers and weavers, mainly producing the fine long Leicestershire wool used in producing worsted and tammy cloth.
At the heart of the village, not far from the crossroads, stands the parish Church of St. Michael, first recorded in 1149. More can be read about the church on its website. It is of ancient origin, with a typical Leicestershire spire atop its fourteenth-century tower. Only a few fragments of its very ancient past remain, it was largely restored in the nineteenth century, but on the north side, over the present vestry door can be seen a tympanum, removed from a Norman doorway when the present south aisle was added in the 1850s. This probably dates from 8th century and shows a bishop (it has been suggested that it may be a representation of St. Wifred), the lion of the Gospel and the Holy Spirit, represented by a dove, overcoming the demons of paganism. This suggests that this may have been a pagan site in pre-Christian times. Against the east Window is the grave of John Bold, an eighteenth-century curate, a man of great sanctity who devoted his ministry to the good of local people. Inside the church, a most remarkable piece of furniture is the ancient parish chest, of great antiquity, constructed by the 'dug-out' method, possibly in the years following the conquest. The tower has eight bells, remarkable among bellringers for a peal of 12,896 changes of Cambridge Surprise Major, rung in 7 hours, 35 minutes on 28 April 1923.

Other churches are the Methodist Church on the Hinckley Road, a small Victorian building, and the more recently opened Living Rock Church on Station Road, a gathered evangelical congregation who meet in a former converted factory building.

The local Church School, now known as Manorfield Primary School has been on its present site since the late 1960s and has grown considerably over the years. The present roll is over 400 pupils. The village's earlier school buildings are still in use for the benefit of the community, the earliest built being the former Junior School on New Road, which is now used as the Village Community Hall, with the former Infant School on the Hinckley Road now converted for use as the Old School Surgery.

To the west of St. Michael's Church lies the curiously named 'Nock Verges'. This straight lane, leading now to the local cemetery is believed to have been the local archery butts, at the time when young men were expected to regularly hone their skills on the long-bow – a weapon so essential to the defence of the nation – 'nock' indicating a notch that a bowstring rests in, and 'verge' being an area of green grass. This is borne out by the 'sharpening' stone on the north side of the chancel of the church.

Public houses in the village were well-used in the days of the heavy quarrying industry, but the village still supports quite a number, the Blue Bell Inn and the Bull's Head in Long Street, (on either side of the Crossroads) and the Star Inn on New Road. Also popular is the newer establishment 'Nemo's Bar and Restaurant' just outside the village at Stoney Cove. This was formerly known as Lanes Hill Quarry or 'Top Pit' to the locals until it went out of use and filled with water.

Clustering around the crossroads at the centre of the village are its oldest cottages, presenting a pleasant village scene. In Long Street, standing back from the road, opposite the Blue Bell Inn is Stanton House, the eighteenth century Dower House used by the Dixie family of Market Bosworth while next door is Yew Tree House, with a Queen Anne façade concealing an ancient bake-house to the rear. Elsewhere in the village, along Nock Verges, is the Victorian Old Rectory, built by Rev'd John Sankey, who also paid for the construction of the church wall and the addition of a south Aisle to the church in the 1850s. The Old Rectory was, for some years, the home of Rt.Hon. Nigel Lawson, former Chancellor of the Exchequer (now Lord Lawson of Blaby).

Much expansion took place during the late nineteenth century, as the village sought to accommodate its workforce, with rows of terraced properties serving that purpose. However, in the early 1960s, modern housing began to be built in quantity, with the first estate roads being built on the old field known as the Fleet, named after the streams running through it. This gave its name to one of the roads constructed at this time, with John Bold Avenue running parallel accessed by Clint Hill Drive. Further development was to follow and still continues, the village expanding onto former industrial sites and fields along the perimeter.

There is little industry in the village now, one or two factories have closed. However, on the outskirts may be found a large Calor Gas supply depot, close to the adjacent railway line. The village is well served by its local shops, having a good number, including a post office, hardware shop, hairdressers and opticians, as well as grocery stores and cafe. There is also a public library on the small St. Michael's Court shopping area.

References

Stoney Stanton Action Group
Stoney Stanton Parish Election Results  404
 Nairn Across Britain. 1: From London to Lancashire (BBC2, 1972) at 19:20 minutes from start

References:
Stoney Stanton Parish Council: stoneystanton.leicestershireparishcouncils.org,
St Michael's Church: (together with St.Mary's Church, Broughton Astley, and St.Michael's Church, Croft) st.mary.users.btopenworld.com. This site contains a full biography of Rev'd John Bold by Canon Michael Banks, and historical information about the church and its surroundings.

Villages in Leicestershire
Civil parishes in Leicestershire
Blaby